Kotlovina is a 2011 Croatian drama film written and directed by Tomislav Radić.

Cast
 Mirela Brekalo as Ana
 Igor Kovač as Jakov
 Suzana Nikolić as Seka 
  as Mirko
 Boris Buzančić as Dida
  as Lucija
 Goran Navojec as Damir
  as Krešo
 Melita Jurišić as Mimi

References

External links
 

2011 films
2011 drama films
2010s Croatian-language films
Croatian drama films